The Society for Occupational Health Psychology (SOHP) is the first organization in the United States to be devoted to occupational health psychology. It is dedicated to the application of scientific knowledge in order to improve worker health and well-being.

Constitution
The Society for Occupational Health Psychology is a learned society "dedicated to the generation, dissemination, and application of scientific knowledge in order to improve worker health and well-being." The goals of the society are threefold. First, SOHP promotes psychological research on important questions pertaining to occupational health. Second, SOHP encourages the application of research to improve the health and safety of people who work. Third, the society works to enhance undergraduate and graduate training in the field of occupational health psychology (OHP). Full membership in SOHP requires "a postgraduate degree in a field related to OHP," such as "occupational health psychology, public health, occupational health, industrial hygiene."

SOHP, together with the American Psychological Association (APA) and the National Institute for Occupational Safety and Health (NIOSH), organizes every two years an international conference dedicated to research and practice in occupational health psychology. The organization also provides resources that are useful in research, teaching, and practice. The American Psychological Association sponsors an online listserv, with many contributors from SOHP, to promote discussion and information sharing regarding occupational health psychology. SOHP also publishes a newsletter at least twice per year in order to keep members abreast of organizational developments. Through an organizational arrangement SOHP has with APA, members of the Society receive a subscription to the Journal of Occupational Health Psychology. Beginning with an agreement in 2008, the society coordinates member benefits and international conferences with the European Academy of Occupational Health Psychology (EA-OHP).

History
SOHP is the first organization in the United States to be devoted to OHP. The development of this discipline within psychology and the origins of the society are closely linked.

The American Psychological Association (APA) and the National Institute for Occupational Safety and Health (NIOSH) jointly organized an International Conference on Work, Stress, and Health in Washington, DC in 1990. At the conference, the individuals who would form the core of SOHP began to get to know each other. Beginning with the conference in 1990, APA and NIOSH arranged a series of Work, Stress, and Health conferences in two- to three-year cycles (now two-year cycles).

In 1996, with the help of some of the conference organizers, APA began publication of the Journal of Occupational Health Psychology. The European Academy of Occupational Health Psychology (EA-OHP) was established in 1999. In the U.S., researchers arrived at the idea that the best way to train the next generation would be to create graduate programs in OHP. Beginning in the mid-1990s, APA and NIOSH began to furnish seed money to support graduate training in OHP. By 2001, there were OHP graduate programs at 11 US universities. Through the 1990s, momentum was developing in terms of institution-building in OHP.

Many of the individuals who participated in the APA/NIOSH conferences also attended the first organizational meeting devoted to the creation of an OHP-related society in the U.S. The meeting was held at the University of South Florida. Over the next four years a series of organizational meetings took place that helped establish the society. In 2005, at a meeting held at the offices of the American Psychological Association, the Society for Occupational Health Psychology was formally founded, with Leslie Hammer of Portland State University as president. In 2006, the society began to play a role, although a small one, in organizing the Work, Stress, and Health conference held that year. Two years later, the society became a full partner with APA and NIOSH in organizing the Work, Stress, and Health conferences. In 2008, the society began to coordinate activities, including conference scheduling, with its European counterpart, EA-OHP. More detailed descriptions of the historical development of the society have been published in 2007 and 2009.

In 2017, SOHP began publishing its own journal, Occupational Health Science, under the editorship of Robert Sinclair.

See also
 European Academy of Occupational Health Psychology
 Health psychology
 Industrial and organizational psychology
 Work & Stress

References

External links
 

Occupational health psychology
Psychology organizations based in the United States
Organizations established in 2005